Beşiktepe is a village in the Göynücek District, of the Amasya Province, in Turkey. Its population is 108 (2021).

References 

Villages in Göynücek District